Leukotriene A4 hydrolase, also known as LTA4H is a human gene. The protein encoded by this gene is a bifunctional enzyme which converts leukotriene A4 to leukotriene B4 and acts as an aminopeptidase.

Function

This enzyme belongs to the family of hydrolases, specifically those acting on ether bonds (ether hydrolases).  The systematic name of this enzyme class is (7E,9E,11Z,14Z)-(5S,6S)-5,6-epoxyicosa-7,9,11,14-tetraenoate hydrolase. Other names in common use include LTA4 hydrolase, LTA4H, and leukotriene A4 hydrolase.  This enzyme participates in arachidonic acid metabolism.

Catalyzed reaction

Structure

References

Further reading

External links
 

EC 3.3.2
Enzymes of known structure